Hamare Tumhare is a 1979 Hindi movie, produced by F. C. Mehra and directed by Umesh Mehra. The film stars Sanjeev Kumar, Raakhee, Amjad Khan, Prem Krishen, David, Mehmood, Asrani, Anil Kapoor (In his film debut), Lucky Ali, and Amrish Puri. The film's music is by R. D. Burman. The rights to this film are owned by Shah Rukh Khan's Red Chillies Entertainment.

Plot

Widower Jairaj Verma lives with his four sons in a small apartment. Three of his sons are in their teens, while his youngest son is around 12 years. On the other hand, there is Maya Sinha, a widow, who also lives in a small apartment with three children, two sons and a daughter, Komal, who is about to get married. Then rumors spread abound that Maya and Jairaj are having an affair, and this adversely affects Komal's marriage, leaving her angry and confused. Jairaj and Maya's attempts to pacify their respective children that they are husband and wife, is of no avail, as they are convinced that Maya and Jairaj are having an illicit affair. The only solution to end this dilemma is for Jairaj and Maya to get married, and live together as a family, but will their children and the community accept them as husband and wife?

Cast
 Sanjeev Kumar as Jayraj Verma
 Raakhee as Maya Sinha
 Amjad Khan as Mr. Chaudhary
 Anil Kapoor as Vipin
 Prem Krishen as Vikram Sinha
 David as Mr. Sinha
 Pucky Ali as Vijay
 Lucky Ali as Ajay
 Mehmood as Pandit Brij Bhushan
 Asrani as Gauri Shankar
 Amrish Puri as General Manager
 Rakesh Bedi as Suneel
 Shubha Khote as Mrs. Brij Bhushan
 Gayatri as Komal Sinha
 Radhika Sarathkumar as Sonia
 Pinchoo Kapoor as Mr. Verma
 Lalita Kumari as Lady From Family Planning Center

Soundtrack
The music of the film was composed by R.D. Burman, while lyrics were penned by Yogesh.

External links 
 

Films scored by R. D. Burman
1979 films
1970s Hindi-language films
Films directed by Umesh Mehra